Reo eutypus is a spider in the family Mimetidae ("pirate spiders"), in the infraorder Araneomorphae ("true spiders").
It is found in the USA.

References

Mimetidae
Spiders described in 1935